The 2005–06 Nashville Predators season was the eighth season of the Nashville Predators in the National Hockey League. The Predators qualified for the Stanley Cup playoffs for the second consecutive season.

Regular season

The Predators were the last team to record their first regulation loss of the regular season. They opened the season with an 8–0–1 stretch before losing at home to the Edmonton Oilers on October 29, 2005, 5–1.

On March 9, 2006, David Legwand tied the record for the fastest regular season overtime goal scored (set on December 30, 1995, by Mats Sundin) when he scored just six seconds into the overtime period to give the Predators a 3–2 road win over the Vancouver Canucks.
Starting goaltender Tomas Vokoun missed the final eight regular season games and the playoffs due to a blood condition.
On April 15, 2006, Chris Mason was credited for a goal when Phoenix Coyotes forward Geoff Sanderson shot the puck into his own net. Mason became the ninth NHL goaltender to score a goal and joined Damian Rhodes as the only goaltenders to be credited with a goal in both the American Hockey League and NHL. In response, Mason said, "It was a cheesy goal. Someone else should have received it."

Final standings

Schedule and results

Regular season

|- align="center" bgcolor="#CCFFCC" 
|1||W||October 5, 2005||3–2 || align="left"|  San Jose Sharks (2005–06) ||1–0–0 || 
|- align="center" bgcolor="#CCFFCC" 
|2||W||October 8, 2005||3–2 SO|| align="left"|  Mighty Ducks of Anaheim (2005–06) ||2–0–0 || 
|- align="center" bgcolor="#CCFFCC" 
|3||W||October 12, 2005||5–4 || align="left"| @ Colorado Avalanche (2005–06) ||3–0–0 || 
|- align="center" bgcolor="#CCFFCC" 
|4||W||October 13, 2005||5–4 SO|| align="left"| @ Phoenix Coyotes (2005–06) ||4–0–0 || 
|- align="center" bgcolor="#CCFFCC" 
|5||W||October 15, 2005||4–1 || align="left"| @ St. Louis Blues (2005–06) ||5–0–0 || 
|- align="center" bgcolor="#CCFFCC" 
|6||W||October 20, 2005||3–2 SO|| align="left"|  St. Louis Blues (2005–06) ||6–0–0 || 
|- align="center" bgcolor="#CCFFCC" 
|7||W||October 22, 2005||2–1 || align="left"|  San Jose Sharks (2005–06) ||7–0–0 || 
|- align="center" bgcolor="#CCFFCC" 
|8||W||October 25, 2005||5–3 || align="left"|  Chicago Blackhawks (2005–06) ||8–0–0 || 
|- align="center" 
|9||L||October 26, 2005||2–3 OT|| align="left"| @ Columbus Blue Jackets (2005–06) ||8–0–1 || 
|- align="center" bgcolor="#FFBBBB"
|10||L||October 29, 2005||1–5 || align="left"|  Edmonton Oilers (2005–06) ||8–1–1 || 
|-

|- align="center" bgcolor="#FFBBBB"
|11||L||November 1, 2005||1–4 || align="left"| @ Mighty Ducks of Anaheim (2005–06) ||8–2–1 || 
|- align="center" 
|12||L||November 2, 2005||2–3 OT|| align="left"| @ San Jose Sharks (2005–06) ||8–2–2 || 
|- align="center" 
|13||L||November 5, 2005||2–3 SO|| align="left"| @ Los Angeles Kings (2005–06) ||8–2–3 || 
|- align="center" bgcolor="#CCFFCC" 
|14||W||November 8, 2005||3–2 || align="left"|  Edmonton Oilers (2005–06) ||9–2–3 || 
|- align="center" bgcolor="#CCFFCC" 
|15||W||November 10, 2005||5–3 || align="left"|  Dallas Stars (2005–06) ||10–2–3 || 
|- align="center" bgcolor="#CCFFCC" 
|16||W||November 12, 2005||3–1 || align="left"|  St. Louis Blues (2005–06) ||11–2–3 || 
|- align="center" bgcolor="#CCFFCC" 
|17||W||November 15, 2005||3–2 || align="left"|  Los Angeles Kings (2005–06) ||12–2–3 || 
|- align="center" bgcolor="#FFBBBB"
|18||L||November 19, 2005||2–4 || align="left"| @ Minnesota Wild (2005–06) ||12–3–3 || 
|- align="center" bgcolor="#CCFFCC" 
|19||W||November 23, 2005||4–2 || align="left"| @ Columbus Blue Jackets (2005–06) ||13–3–3 || 
|- align="center" bgcolor="#CCFFCC" 
|20||W||November 24, 2005||4–3 || align="left"|  Los Angeles Kings (2005–06) ||14–3–3 || 
|- align="center" bgcolor="#FFBBBB"
|21||L||November 26, 2005||1–3 || align="left"|  Dallas Stars (2005–06) ||14–4–3 || 
|- align="center" bgcolor="#CCFFCC" 
|22||W||November 29, 2005||2–0 || align="left"|  Calgary Flames (2005–06) ||15–4–3 || 
|-

|- align="center" bgcolor="#CCFFCC" 
|23||W||December 1, 2005||2–1 || align="left"|  Minnesota Wild (2005–06) ||16–4–3 || 
|- align="center" bgcolor="#CCFFCC" 
|24||W||December 3, 2005||4–3 SO|| align="left"|  Philadelphia Flyers (2005–06) ||17–4–3 || 
|- align="center" bgcolor="#CCFFCC" 
|25||W||December 7, 2005||5–2 || align="left"| @ Washington Capitals (2005–06) ||18–4–3 || 
|- align="center" bgcolor="#FFBBBB"
|26||L||December 8, 2005||1–5 || align="left"|  New York Rangers (2005–06) ||18–5–3 || 
|- align="center" bgcolor="#FFBBBB"
|27||L||December 10, 2005||3–4 || align="left"| @ Tampa Bay Lightning (2005–06) ||18–6–3 || 
|- align="center" bgcolor="#FFBBBB"
|28||L||December 13, 2005||3–7 || align="left"| @ Florida Panthers (2005–06) ||18–7–3 || 
|- align="center" bgcolor="#CCFFCC" 
|29||W||December 15, 2005||5–3 || align="left"|  Chicago Blackhawks (2005–06) ||19–7–3 || 
|- align="center" bgcolor="#CCFFCC" 
|30||W||December 17, 2005||7–3 || align="left"|  Columbus Blue Jackets (2005–06) ||20–7–3 || 
|- align="center" bgcolor="#CCFFCC" 
|31||W||December 20, 2005||3–2 || align="left"|  Colorado Avalanche (2005–06) ||21–7–3 || 
|- align="center" bgcolor="#CCFFCC" 
|32||W||December 21, 2005||6–1 || align="left"| @ Chicago Blackhawks (2005–06) ||22–7–3 || 
|- align="center" bgcolor="#CCFFCC" 
|33||W||December 23, 2005||5–4 || align="left"| @ Columbus Blue Jackets (2005–06) ||23–7–3 || 
|- align="center" bgcolor="#CCFFCC" 
|34||W||December 27, 2005||4–3 || align="left"| @ Calgary Flames (2005–06) ||24–7–3 || 
|- align="center" bgcolor="#FFBBBB"
|35||L||December 28, 2005||3–4 || align="left"| @ Vancouver Canucks (2005–06) ||24–8–3 || 
|- align="center" bgcolor="#FFBBBB"
|36||L||December 30, 2005||2–4 || align="left"| @ Edmonton Oilers (2005–06) ||24–9–3 || 
|-

|- align="center" bgcolor="#FFBBBB"
|37||L||January 1, 2006||2–4 || align="left"|  Mighty Ducks of Anaheim (2005–06) ||24–10–3 || 
|- align="center" bgcolor="#FFBBBB"
|38||L||January 3, 2006||0–3 || align="left"| @ Colorado Avalanche (2005–06) ||24–11–3 || 
|- align="center" bgcolor="#CCFFCC" 
|39||W||January 4, 2006||4–3 || align="left"| @ St. Louis Blues (2005–06) ||25–11–3 || 
|- align="center" bgcolor="#FFBBBB"
|40||L||January 6, 2006||1–3 || align="left"|  Detroit Red Wings (2005–06) ||25–12–3 || 
|- align="center" bgcolor="#CCFFCC" 
|41||W||January 8, 2006||5–1 || align="left"| @ Chicago Blackhawks (2005–06) ||26–12–3 || 
|- align="center" bgcolor="#CCFFCC" 
|42||W||January 10, 2006||2–1 || align="left"|  New York Islanders (2005–06) ||27–12–3 || 
|- align="center" 
|43||L||January 11, 2006||3–4 SO|| align="left"| @ Atlanta Thrashers (2005–06) ||27–12–4 || 
|- align="center" 
|44||L||January 13, 2006||4–5 OT|| align="left"| @ Carolina Hurricanes (2005–06) ||27–12–5 || 
|- align="center" bgcolor="#CCFFCC" 
|45||W||January 15, 2006||5–4 || align="left"|  Pittsburgh Penguins (2005–06) ||28–12–5 || 
|- align="center" 
|46||L||January 19, 2006||3–4 SO|| align="left"|  New Jersey Devils (2005–06) ||28–12–6 || 
|- align="center" bgcolor="#CCFFCC" 
|47||W||January 21, 2006||7–2 || align="left"|  Columbus Blue Jackets (2005–06) ||29–12–6 || 
|- align="center" bgcolor="#CCFFCC" 
|48||W||January 23, 2006||3–2 || align="left"| @ Detroit Red Wings (2005–06) ||30–12–6 || 
|- align="center" bgcolor="#CCFFCC" 
|49||W||January 24, 2006||2–1 OT|| align="left"| @ Detroit Red Wings (2005–06) ||31–12–6 || 
|- align="center" bgcolor="#FFBBBB"
|50||L||January 26, 2006||1–5 || align="left"| @ Minnesota Wild (2005–06) ||31–13–6 || 
|- align="center" bgcolor="#FFBBBB"
|51||L||January 28, 2006||3–4 || align="left"| @ Columbus Blue Jackets (2005–06) ||31–14–6 || 
|-

|- align="center" bgcolor="#FFBBBB"
|52||L||February 1, 2006||1–2 || align="left"| @ Dallas Stars (2005–06) ||31–15–6 || 
|- align="center" bgcolor="#CCFFCC" 
|53||W||February 2, 2006||4–3 OT|| align="left"|  Colorado Avalanche (2005–06) ||32–15–6 || 
|- align="center" bgcolor="#CCFFCC" 
|54||W||February 4, 2006||6–0 || align="left"|  Chicago Blackhawks (2005–06) ||33–15–6 || 
|- align="center" bgcolor="#FFBBBB"
|55||L||February 6, 2006||2–4 || align="left"| @ Dallas Stars (2005–06) ||33–16–6 || 
|- align="center" bgcolor="#FFBBBB"
|56||L||February 8, 2006||0–6 || align="left"| @ Detroit Red Wings (2005–06) ||33–17–6 || 
|- align="center" bgcolor="#FFBBBB"
|57||L||February 9, 2006||2–3 || align="left"|  Detroit Red Wings (2005–06) ||33–18–6 || 
|- align="center" bgcolor="#CCFFCC" 
|58||W||February 11, 2006||5–2 || align="left"|  Columbus Blue Jackets (2005–06) ||34–18–6 || 
|-

|- align="center" bgcolor="#FFBBBB"
|59||L||March 1, 2006||0–3 || align="left"| @ Chicago Blackhawks (2005–06) ||34–19–6 || 
|- align="center" bgcolor="#CCFFCC" 
|60||W||March 2, 2006||3–1 || align="left"|  Vancouver Canucks (2005–06) ||35–19–6 || 
|- align="center" 
|61||L||March 5, 2006||2–3 OT|| align="left"| @ Edmonton Oilers (2005–06) ||35–19–7 || 
|- align="center" bgcolor="#CCFFCC" 
|62||W||March 7, 2006||3–2 || align="left"| @ Calgary Flames (2005–06) ||36–19–7 || 
|- align="center" bgcolor="#CCFFCC" 
|63||W||March 9, 2006||3–2 OT|| align="left"| @ Vancouver Canucks (2005–06) ||37–19–7 || 
|- align="center" 
|64||L||March 11, 2006||2–3 OT|| align="left"| @ San Jose Sharks (2005–06) ||37–19–8 || 
|- align="center" bgcolor="#CCFFCC" 
|65||W||March 14, 2006||5–0 || align="left"|  Vancouver Canucks (2005–06) ||38–19–8 || 
|- align="center" bgcolor="#CCFFCC" 
|66||W||March 16, 2006||2–0 || align="left"|  Phoenix Coyotes (2005–06) ||39–19–8 || 
|- align="center" bgcolor="#CCFFCC" 
|67||W||March 18, 2006||9–4 || align="left"|  Calgary Flames (2005–06) ||40–19–8 || 
|- align="center" bgcolor="#CCFFCC" 
|68||W||March 20, 2006||4–2 || align="left"|  St. Louis Blues (2005–06) ||41–19–8 || 
|- align="center" bgcolor="#CCFFCC" 
|69||W||March 21, 2006||3–2 SO|| align="left"| @ Detroit Red Wings (2005–06) ||42–19–8 || 
|- align="center" bgcolor="#FFBBBB"
|70||L||March 24, 2006||3–6 || align="left"| @ Mighty Ducks of Anaheim (2005–06) ||42–20–8 || 
|- align="center" bgcolor="#FFBBBB"
|71||L||March 25, 2006||4–6 || align="left"| @ Los Angeles Kings (2005–06) ||42–21–8 || 
|- align="center" bgcolor="#FFBBBB"
|72||L||March 28, 2006||3–5 || align="left"| @ Phoenix Coyotes (2005–06) ||42–22–8 || 
|- align="center" bgcolor="#FFBBBB"
|73||L||March 30, 2006||2–4 || align="left"|  Detroit Red Wings (2005–06) ||42–23–8 || 
|-

|- align="center" bgcolor="#CCFFCC" 
|74||W||April 1, 2006||2–1 || align="left"|  St. Louis Blues (2005–06) ||43–23–8 || 
|- align="center" bgcolor="#FFBBBB"
|75||L||April 3, 2006||1–3 || align="left"|  Columbus Blue Jackets (2005–06) ||43–24–8 || 
|- align="center" bgcolor="#FFBBBB"
|76||L||April 5, 2006||3–4 || align="left"| @ Chicago Blackhawks (2005–06) ||43–25–8 || 
|- align="center" bgcolor="#CCFFCC" 
|77||W||April 6, 2006||3–0 || align="left"| @ St. Louis Blues (2005–06) ||44–25–8 || 
|- align="center" bgcolor="#CCFFCC" 
|78||W||April 8, 2006||2–1 SO|| align="left"|  Chicago Blackhawks (2005–06) ||45–25–8 || 
|- align="center" bgcolor="#CCFFCC" 
|79||W||April 11, 2006||2–0 || align="left"| @ St. Louis Blues (2005–06) ||46–25–8 || 
|- align="center" bgcolor="#CCFFCC" 
|80||W||April 13, 2006||4–2 || align="left"|  Minnesota Wild (2005–06) ||47–25–8 || 
|- align="center" bgcolor="#CCFFCC" 
|81||W||April 15, 2006||5–1 || align="left"|  Phoenix Coyotes (2005–06) ||48–25–8 || 
|- align="center" bgcolor="#CCFFCC" 
|82||W||April 18, 2006||6–3 || align="left"|  Detroit Red Wings (2005–06) ||49–25–8 || 
|-

|-
| Legend:

Playoffs

|- align="center" bgcolor="#CCFFCC"
| 1 ||W|| April 21, 2006 || 4–3 || align="left"| San Jose Sharks || Predators lead 1–0 || 
|- align="center" bgcolor="#FFBBBB"
| 2 ||L|| April 23, 2006 || 0–3 || align="left"| San Jose Sharks || Series tied 1–1 || 
|- align="center" bgcolor="#FFBBBB"
| 3 ||L|| April 25, 2006 || 1–4 || align="left"|@ San Jose Sharks || Sharks lead 2–1 || 
|- align="center" bgcolor="#FFBBBB"
| 4 ||L|| April 27, 2006 || 4–5 || align="left"|@ San Jose Sharks || Sharks lead 3–1 || 
|- align="center" bgcolor="#FFBBBB"
| 5 ||L|| April 30, 2006 || 1–2 || align="left"| San Jose Sharks || Sharks win 4–1 || 
|-

|-
| Legend:

Player statistics

Scoring
 Position abbreviations: C = Center; D = Defense; G = Goaltender; LW = Left Wing; RW = Right Wing
  = Joined team via a transaction (e.g., trade, waivers, signing) during the season. Stats reflect time with the Predators only.
  = Left team via a transaction (e.g., trade, waivers, release) during the season. Stats reflect time with the Predators only.

Goaltending

Awards and records

Awards

Transactions
The Predators were involved in the following transactions from February 17, 2005, the day after the 2004–05 NHL season was officially cancelled, through June 19, 2006, the day of the deciding game of the 2006 Stanley Cup Finals.

Trades

Players acquired

Players lost

Signings

Draft picks
Nashville's draft picks at the 2005 NHL Entry Draft held at the Westin Hotel in Ottawa, Ontario.

Notes

References

Nash
Nash
Nashville Predators seasons
Nashville Predators
Nashville Predators